Toni Gänge (born 27 January 1988) is a German former professional footballer who played as a defender.

Career
In January 2012, Gänge left SV Wilhelmshaven for Westfalenliga team 1. FC Kaan-Marienborn.

In July 2020, Gänge announced his retirement from playing due to cartilage damage.

References

External links
 
 

1988 births
Living people
People from Kyritz
German footballers
Footballers from Brandenburg
Association football defenders
3. Liga players
Regionalliga players
SV Werder Bremen II players
Hertha BSC II players
SV Wilhelmshaven players
1. FC Kaan-Marienborn players